Harbuck is an unincorporated community in Polk County, Tennessee, United States.

References

Unincorporated communities in Polk County, Tennessee
Unincorporated communities in Tennessee